Earl "Irish" Harrist (April 20, 1919 – September 7, 1998) was an American Major League Baseball pitcher with the Cincinnati Reds, Chicago White Sox, Washington Senators, St. Louis Browns and the Detroit Tigers between 1945 and 1953. Harrist batted and threw right-handed. He was born in Dubach, Louisiana.

In five seasons, Harrist had a win–loss record of 12–28 in 132 games, started 24 games, 2 complete games, 50 games finished, 10 saves, 383 innings pitched, 391 hits allowed, 217 runs allowed, 185 earned runs allowed, 20 home runs allowed, 193 walks allowed, 162 strikeouts, 20 hit batsmen, 9 wild pitches, 1,705 batters faced and a 4.34 ERA. He led the American League in Hit Batsmen (10) in 1952.

Harrist died in Simsboro, Louisiana on September 7, 1998 at the age of 79.

References

External links

Retrosheet
Baseball Almanac

1919 births
1998 deaths
Cincinnati Reds players
Chicago White Sox players
Washington Senators (1901–1960) players
St. Louis Browns players
Detroit Tigers players
Major League Baseball pitchers
Cleveland Indians scouts
Houston Astros scouts
Baseball players from Louisiana
El Dorado Lions players
Durham Bulls players
Columbia Reds players
Birmingham Barons players
Syracuse Chiefs players
Newark Bears (IL) players
Kansas City Blues (baseball) players
Oakland Oaks (baseball) players
Buffalo Bisons (minor league) players
Sacramento Solons players
Victoria Rosebuds players
People from Dubach, Louisiana